Raorchestes andersoni is a species of frog in the family Rhacophoridae. It is found in northeast India, northern Myanmar, and Tibet and Yunnan, China. The common names Anderson's bubble-nest frog, Anderson's bush frog and tuberculed small treefrog have been coined for it.

Its natural habitats are tropical forest edges and marshes. It is an arboreal species that breeds in small, temporary water pools. It has been recorded in the Nameri National Park in India and just outside the Hkakabo Razi National Park in Myanmar.

References

Amphibians described in 1927
Frogs of China
Frogs of India
Amphibians of Myanmar
Fauna of Tibet
Taxa named by Ernst Ahl
Taxonomy articles created by Polbot